Maria Yakovlevna Poiret (stage name Marusina, in the first marriage Sveshnikova, in the second - Orlova-Davydova; January 4, 1863, Moscow - October 13, 1933, Moscow) - Russian actress, composer, singer, poet. Author of the romance "I was going home."

Biography
Born in the family of a fencing and gymnastics teacher Yakov Viktorovich Poiret (1826–1877) and the daughter of a cloth manufacturer Yulia Andreevna Tarasenkova (1830–1871). Elder brother Emmanuel emigrated to France in his youth and became a cartoonist, known under the pseudonym Caran d'Ash. She lost her parents early and was raised by her uncle. At the age of 16, she married engineer Mikhail Sveshnikov, who was much older than his wife and did not share her passion for art. Soon, Maria experienced a nervous breakdown, as a result of which she was placed in a psychiatric hospital, from where she was rescued by the entrepreneur M. V. Lentovsky.

Since 1880, she began her career as an actress, taking the pseudonym Marusina. In 1880–1890, she participated in Lentovsky's projects, performed in operettas and vaudeville, often playing male roles (Caprice in Journey to the Moon by J. Offenbach, etc.), sang gypsy romances. Lentovsky himself considered Maria a gypsy by nature, according to him, this was indicated by “her ability to enjoy freedom, her carelessness, indifference to things, her readiness for a nomadic life. The strength and sincerity of feelings, incendiary temperament made her a gypsy.

Since 1890, she performed on the stage of the Alexandrinsky Theater in vaudeville and light comedies, in 1898–1900 - at the Moscow Maly Theatre. In 1901, she owned her own melodrama theatre in the Aquarium Garden, for which she wrote the romance Swan Song. This romance, like the later romance "I was driving home", quickly became popular.

In 1904, she went to the Russo-Japanese War as a correspondent for “Novoye Vremya” and lived in Port Arthur for several months. Returning, she was ill with typhoid fever.

In 1914 she married Count Alexei Orlov-Davydov. In 1915 she was arrested, being accused by her husband of fraud - deceit, as a result of which consent was obtained for marriage, feigning pregnancy and trying to pass off someone else's newborn child as her own. The process became one of the most high-profile cases of the time. Maria was acquitted in a criminal case, but the fact of the substitution of the child was proven.

In Soviet times, she lived in Moscow in poverty. She died in 1933.

Literature
Countess Marusya: The fate of the artist Marie Poiret / E. Ukolova, V. Ukolov. - M .: Publishing House of the International Fund for the Humanities Initiatives, 2002.

References

1863 births
1933 deaths
Actresses from Moscow
Russian composers
Russian women singers
Russian poets
Russian women composers
Russian women poets